Shio Mujiri, born Elizbar Mujiri (ელიზბარ მუჯირი), (born 1 February 1969) is a Georgian Orthodox hierarch who became bishop of Senaki and Chkhorotsku in 2003 and Patriarchal locum tenens in 2017.

Education and early career 
Born on 1 February 1969 in Tbilisi, the capital of then-Soviet Georgia, Murjiri was trained as a cellist at the Tbilisi State Conservatoire, which he graduated from in 1991. He received his theological education at the Batumi Theological Seminary in Georgia and further, in Russia, at the Moscow Theological Academy and Saint Tikhon's Orthodox University, from which he received a Doctor of Divinity degree in 2015.

Elizbar Mujiri was tonsured a monk under the name of Shio in 1993. He was ordained a deacon in 1995 and a priest of the Georgian Orthodox Church in 1996. He was a father superior at the Kldisubani church of Saint George and then at the Narikala church of Saint Nicholas, both in Tbilisi, between 1997 and 2001 when he was moved to lead St. George parish church in Moscow, serving a local Georgian diaspora community.

Bishop 
On 18 August 2003, Shio was appointed to the newly created Georgian Orthodox eparchy of Senaki and Chkhorotsku with a bishops rank. The eparchy was curved out of parts of the Chqondidi and Poti-Senaki bishoprics in the territory of the Samegrelo region. As of 2017, the eparchy operated 39 churches and monasteries. Bishop Shio was additionally placed in charge of the Georgian parishes in Australia and New Zealand on 30 April 2009 and elevated to the rank of a metropolitan on 2 August 2010. He has a seat in the Holy Synod of the Georgian Orthodox Church and is, also, a member of its Canonization Commission.

According to the Georgian media outlets, Bishop Shio was a childhood friend of the President of Georgia Giorgi Margvelashvili and the businessman Levan Vasadze. The latter is known for his conservative views and anti-Western rhetoric and has presided, since 2013, over the board of trustees of the government-sponsored Georgian Demographic Revival Fund of which Shio is also a member.

Patriarchal locum tenens 
On 23 November 2017, Saint George's Day, the seasoned leader of the Georgian Orthodox Church, Catholicos Patriarch Ilia II announced an appointment of Shio as the patriarchal locum tenens, that is a church official who would act as a temporary head of the Georgian Orthodox Church for 40 days after the incumbent Patriarch died, until the Holy Synod elected a new Patriarch. The decree, drafted by Ilia II with his own hand, came amid the ongoing internal tensions within the church leadership, widely publicized in the aftermath of the "cyanide case", in which a Georgian Orthodox priest was arrested and ruled guilty on charges of plotting to murder the Patriarch's personal secretary and adviser with cyanide earlier that year. The incumbent patriarch's decision to name his locum in his own lifetime came to many Georgians as a surprise; the Georgian media suggested this might indicate Ilia II's support for Shio's candidacy as a future patriarch.

Treatment of minorities 

After a violent mob, including several orthodox priests, attacked and injured numerous participants of an LGBT march, as well as journalists, in Tbilisi on Jun 5, 2021, Mujiri did not condemn the violence, but attempted to leverage it for his political agenda, suggesting that to prevent further violence, Georgia should "outlaw insulting religious and national feelings".

See also 
 LGBT rights in Georgia (country)
 Separation of Church and State

References 

1969 births
Bishops of the Georgian Orthodox Church
Clergy from Tbilisi
Living people
21st-century Eastern Orthodox bishops
Saint Tikhon's Orthodox University alumni
Bishops in Georgia (country)
Religious extremism